The following is the result of the World Weightlifting Championships tournaments in year 1911.

Tournament 1
The first tournament (15th World Weightlifting Championships) was held in Stuttgart, Germany from April 29 to April 30, 1911. There were 36 men in action from 3 nations.

Tournament 2
The second tournament (16th World Weightlifting Championships) was held in Berlin, Germany from May 13 to May 14, 1911. There were 27 men in action from 2 nations.

Tournament 3
The third tournament (17th World Weightlifting Championships) was held in Dresden, Germany on June 26, 1911. There were 21 men in action from 3 nations.

Tournament 4
The fourth tournament (18th World Weightlifting Championships) was held in Vienna, Austria-Hungary from June 29 to July 2, 1911. There were 32 men in action from 3 nations.

Medal table

References
Results
Weightlifting World Championships Seniors Statistics

External links
International Weightlifting Federation

World Weightlifting Championships
World Weightlifting Championships
World Weightlifting Championships
World Weightlifting Championships